The 1904–05 MIT Engineers men's ice hockey season was the 6th season of play for the program.

Season
After having to cancel their entire 1903–04 season due to poor weather conditions, MIT returned to the ice in January 1905. Unfortunately, the weather again forced them to cancel their first game of the season against Brown. When they did finally play a game, they came up against a juggernaut in Harvard and lost one of the most lopsided games in college hockey history (0–25). After that initial embarrassment the team settled down and won their next five games, albeit against non-college opponents.

The team did not have a head coach but P. S. Crowell served as team manager.

Note: Massachusetts Institute of Technology athletics were referred to as 'Engineers' or 'Techmen' during the first two decades of the 20th century. By 1920 all sports programs had adopted the Engineer moniker.

Roster

Standings

Schedule and Results

|-
!colspan=12 style=";" | Regular Season

References

MIT Engineers men's ice hockey seasons
MIT
MIT
MIT
MIT
MIT